Treet (Armour Star Treet) is a canned meat product similar to Spam first introduced in 1939 by Armour and Company in the United States.  Sold as  "spiced luncheon loaf", it is made with chicken and pork and has a more finely ground texture than Spam, more akin to bologna or vienna sausages.  Like Spam, it is often fried or baked before consumption. Treet is currently manufactured by Pinnacle Foods.

Nutritional data
A 56 gram (approximately 2 ounce) serving of Treet provides six grams of protein, four grams of carbohydrates, 11 grams of fat (17% US Daily Value) including 3.5 grams of saturated fat (18% US Daily Value), and 140 calories. A serving also contains more than a third of the recommended daily intake of sodium (salt). A 56 gram serving of Treet contains 820 mg of sodium. Treet provides very little in terms of vitamins and minerals (0% vitamin A, 0% vitamin C, 6% calcium, 4% iron).

See also
Prem
Potted meat food product

References

External links
Armour Luncheon Meat Official Site
Cooks.com Recipes: Treet Sandwich and Poor Man's Ham
1956 Armour Treet Sandwich Meat original vintage advertisement

Brand name meats
Canned food
Pinnacle Foods brands
Canned meat
Products introduced in 1939